Scarecrow is a 1973 American road movie directed by Jerry Schatzberg and starring Gene Hackman and Al Pacino. The story involves the relationship between two men who travel from California seeking to start a business in Pittsburgh.

At the 1973 Cannes Film Festival, the film tied for the Grand Prix du Festival International du Film, the highest honor. While it fared poorly commercially, Scarecrow later gained cult status.

Plot

Two vagabonds, Max Millan, a short-tempered ex-convict, and Francis Lionel "Lion" Delbuchi, a childlike former sailor, meet on the road in California and agree to become partners in a car-wash business once they reach Pittsburgh. Lion is traveling to Detroit to see a child whom he has never met and make amends with his wife Annie, to whom he has sent all of the money that he had earned while at sea. Max agrees to take a detour on his way to Pittsburgh, where the bank to which Max has been sending all his seed money is located.

While visiting Max's sister in Denver, the pair's antics land them in a prison farm for a month. Max blames Lion for their incarceration and shuns him. Lion is befriended by a powerful inmate named Riley, who later tries to sexually assault Lion and physically savages and emotionally traumatizes him. Max rekindles his friendship with Lion and becomes his protector, eventually exacting revenge by fighting Riley.

After their release, Max and Lion continue to have a profound effect on each other, although they have both undergone personal transformations and their roles have shifted. Lion is still traumatized and no longer carefree or able to smile, and Max loosens his high-strung aggression, performing a mock striptease to defuse a fight at a bar and make Lion laugh again.

When Max and Lion finally arrive in Detroit, Lion finds a payphone and calls Annie, now remarried and raising their five-year-old son. Annie is still furious with Lion for having abandoned her, and lies that she miscarried their son. Lion is devastated but feigns joy with Max about having a son. Shortly afterward, Lion experiences a breakdown while playing with children in a city park and later becomes catatonic. Max promises Lion, now in a psychiatric hospital, that he will do anything to help him, and boards a train to Pittsburgh with a round-trip ticket.

Cast

Production

Warner Bros. approved the project, looking for a small-budget film after executives became less confident in the success of larger projects. Director Jerry Schatzberg's preference for the roles of Max and Lion were Gene Hackman and Al Pacino, as Schatzberg had worked with Pacino on The Panic in Needle Park (1971).

To understand their characters, Pacino and Hackman donned costumes and posed as beggars in San Francisco. However, Pacino, an advocate of method acting, found his techniques conflicted with those of Hackman, who would be silent before shooting while Pacino paced. Although Hackman enjoyed the production, Pacino later commented, "It wasn't the easiest working with Hackman, who I love as an actor."

Reception

At the 1973 Cannes Film Festival, the film won the interim equivalent of the Palme d'Or, the Grand Prix du Festival International du Film, shared with The Hireling, directed by Alan Bridges.  It also won Best Non-European Film at Denmark's 1974 Bodil Awards. In the U.S., Scarecrow proved to be a box-office bomb.

Roger Ebert awarded the film three stars, comparing the story to those of Of Mice and Men and Midnight Cowboy, and positively reviewed the performances of Pacino and Hackman, the writing and setting. In The New York Times, Vincent Canby called Max and Lion "classic drifters" and "marvelously realized characters."

In a review of Scarecrow upon its 2013 rerelease, Peter Bradshaw of The Guardian described the film as "a freewheeling masterpiece," describing Hackman and Pacino as giving "the performances of their lives." Peter Biskind has described the film as of "secondary" significance in his book Easy Riders, Raging Bulls.

By 2012, Scarecrow was among the best-reviewed films in Schatzberg's career. After gaining a cult following, Schatzberg recruited Seth Cohen to write a sequel, and a screenplay was completed by 2013. The sequel would be set years after Scarecrow, with Max and computer worker Lion reuniting, and Lion learning that his son is alive. The sequel project was complicated by the studio's lack of support and Hackman's retirement from acting.

On Rotten Tomatoes, the film holds a rating of 76% from 33 reviews with the consensus: "If its dramatic dressings are a tad threadbare, Scarecrow survives on the strength of its lead performances and Vilmos Zsigmond's cinematography."

See also
 List of American films of 1973

References

External links
 
 
 
 

1973 films
1973 drama films
1970s drama road movies
American buddy drama films
American prison films
American drama road movies
Films about homelessness
Films directed by Jerry Schatzberg
Films set in California
Films set in Colorado
Films set in Detroit
Films shot in California
Films shot in Colorado
Films shot in Michigan
Films shot in Nevada
Palme d'Or winners
Warner Bros. films
1970s English-language films
1970s American films